Max Gassner (28 November 1926 – 15 June 1994) was a Liechtensteiner alpine skier who competed in the 1948 Winter Olympics.

References

External links
 

1926 births
1994 deaths
Liechtenstein male alpine skiers
Olympic alpine skiers of Liechtenstein
Alpine skiers at the 1948 Winter Olympics